Bento de Jesus Caraça, GCSE, GOL (18 April 1901 – 25 June 1948) was an influential Portuguese mathematician, economist and statistician. Caraça was also a member of the Portuguese Communist Party  and so, he became one of the most famous personalities in the resistance against the authoritarian regime led by António Oliveira Salazar.

Caraça was born in Vila Viçosa, Évora District, in the south of Portugal. He was the son of two peasants, João António Caraça and Domingas da Conceição Espadinha. He lived his first years on the family's farm and he managed to learn how to read with another peasant, José Percheiro.

The easiness of learning demonstrated by Caraça encouraged the spouse of the owner of the farm where he lived to take care of his education. In 1911, Caraça finished his first studies and left his hometown in order to study in Lisbon. After finishing high school with top grades, Caraça joined the Superior Institute of Economic and Financial Sciences (later known as "ISEG").

On November 1, 1919, as a 2nd-year student, Caraça was nominated 2nd assistant by his teacher Mira Fernandes. He graduated in 1923. On December 13, 1924, he was nominated 1st assistant and, on October 14, 1927, he was appointed as a professor. On December 28, 1929, he was nominated cathedratic professor, teaching algebra and infinitesimal calculus.

Meanwhile, Caraça had participated in the foundation of the Portuguese Popular University, an institution created to give working-class people the chance to study. Caraça became a member of the Administration Council when he was still a student and in 1928 he became President of the University. He organised the University's library and several conferences about Mathematics, Art, History and other topics.

References

External links
Bento de Jesus Caraça Institute website

1901 births
1948 deaths
People from Vila Viçosa
Technical University of Lisbon alumni
Portuguese anti-fascists
Portuguese Communist Party politicians
20th-century Portuguese mathematicians
20th-century Portuguese economists
Portuguese statisticians